Bradford House may refer to:

in the United States
(by state and then city)
A. S. Bradford House, Placentia, California, listed on the National Register of Historic Places (NRHP)
 Bradford House (San Rafael, California), listed on the NRHP in California
Bradford House II, Littleton, Colorado, NRHP-listed
Bradford House III Archeological Site, Morrison, Colorado, listed on the NRHP in Colorado
Raymond-Bradford Homestead, Montville, Connecticut, NRHP-listed
Bradford-Huntington House, Norwichtown, Connecticut, NRHP-listed
Bradford-Loockerman House, Dover, Delaware, NRHP-listed
Fielding Bradford House, Georgetown, Kentucky, NRHP-listed
Alexander Bradford House, Stamping Ground, Kentucky, listed on the NRHP in Kentucky
 Bradford House (Lewiston, Maine), NRHP-listed
Bradford House, historic house in NRHP-listed Wiscasset Historic District, Wiscasset, Maine
Capt. Gamaliel Bradford House, Duxbury, Massachusetts, NRHP-listed
Capt. Gershom Bradford House, Duxbury, Massachusetts, NRHP-listed
Captain Daniel Bradford House, Duxbury, Massachusetts, NRHP-listed
 Bradford House (Kingston, Massachusetts), NRHP-listed
Benjamin and Mary Ann Bradford House, Canton, Michigan, NRHP-listed
Bradford-Pettis House, Omaha, Nebraska, NRHP-listed
Robert Bradford House, Centerville, Ohio, listed on the NRHP in Ohio
David Bradford House, Washington, Pennsylvania, listed on the NRHP
The Sister Dominica Manor, formerly known as Bradford House, a building in Providence, Rhode Island
Bradford-Maydwell House, Memphis, Tennessee, listed on the NRHP in Tennessee